Scherzo à la russe may refer to:
 Scherzo à la russe (Tchaikovsky)　– a piano piece by Pyotr Ilyich Tchaikovsky
 Scherzo à la russe (Stravinsky)　– a piece for jazz band (and later arranged for symphony orchestra) by Igor Stravinsky
Scherzo à la Russe (ballet) – a ballet by George Balanchine